Gabriel Bouck (December 16, 1828 – February 21, 1904) was an American lawyer, Democratic politician, and Wisconsin pioneer.  He represented Wisconsin in the United States House of Representatives for two terms. He also served as Wisconsin's 6th Attorney General and was the 24th speaker of the Wisconsin State Assembly.  During the American Civil War he served as a Union Army officer.

Early life and family
He was born in Fultonham, Schoharie County, New York, the fourth of eight children of William C. Bouck and Catherine Lawyer. Bouck lived at Bouck's Island.  His siblings were James Madison; Joseph William, born on October 27, 1809; Christian, born on May 14, 1818; Charles, born on September 9, 1829; Catherine, born on July 11, 1820, married Erskine Danforth; Caroline, married Dr. Volney Danforth; and Anna, born on December 29, 1814, married Lyman Sanford.

His father, William C. Bouck, was elected Governor of New York in 1842 and his uncle, Joseph Bouck, was elected to the House of Representatives from the state of New York serving in the 22nd United States Congress from 1831 to 1833.

Gabriel Bouck prepared for college at Schoharie Academy and The Albany Academy. In 1847, he graduated from Union College with Phi Beta Kappa honors and membership in the Kappa Alpha Society.  He studied law in the Binghamton, New York, offices of Daniel S. Dickinson. Bouck moved to Milwaukee, Wisconsin, in 1848, where he attained admission to the bar. In 1849, he moved to Oshkosh, in Winnebago County, Wisconsin, to practice law.  The 1860 Census listed him as a resident of Oshkosh's third ward.

Military service

Gabriel served in the Union Army during the American Civil War.  In the first month of the war, he helped to raise Company E of the 2nd Wisconsin Infantry Regiment with volunteers from Oshkosh, and was chosen to serve as captain of that company.  This unit was a part of the famous Iron Brigade attached to the Army of the Potomac.

After a year with the 2nd Wisconsin, he accepted a promotion to colonel of the 18th Wisconsin Infantry on April 29, 1862, succeeding Colonel James S. Alban—who had been killed at the Battle of Shiloh.  It was with some reluctance that Bouck accepted this assignment when it was offered by Governor Alexander Randall; he was strongly encouraged to do so by fellow Wisconsin officer Edward S. Bragg. Bouck led the 18th Wisconsin through two years of campaigning in the western theater of the war, serving in the Army of the Tennessee under Ulysses S. Grant and William Tecumseh Sherman.  He resigned from service on January 4, 1864, and returned to Oshkosh.

Following the war, he stayed active in military endeavors, founding two Grand Army of the Republic (G.A.R.) posts.  He also formed the 2nd Company of the Wisconsin National Guard on March 25, 1876, serving as its captain.

Political career
Bouck was an active and loyal member of the Democratic Party, and was elected on the Democratic ticket as Attorney General of Wisconsin serving from 1858 to 1860.  He also served two terms in the Wisconsin State Assembly, in 1860 and 1874, serving the last year as speaker. He was a delegate to the Democratic National Conventions of 1868 and 1872.

Bouck was defeated in his first run for the United States Congress, in 1874, but in 1876 was elected to the United States House of Representatives, receiving 20,623 votes to his Republican opponent, Alanson M. Kimball's 17,847.  He served in the 45th United States Congress, representing Wisconsin's 6th congressional district and was reelected to the 46th Congress as well. His greatest political ambition was to be elected Governor of Wisconsin, the same office held by his father in the state of New York. He was defeated for reelection to the 47th Congress in 1880 by Republican Richard Guenther.

Death
He resumed his law practice in Oshkosh and for many years was head of Bouck & Hilton Attorneys at Law. After four months of being confined to his room at the Athearn Hotel in Oshkosh, he died there on Sunday morning at 2:45 a.m., February 21, 1904. According to his obituary, death was the result of general debility due to old age.  He was 76 years old. His funeral was held at the Masonic Temple of Oshkosh Lodge No. 27. and he is buried in Oshkosh.

Electoral history

Wisconsin Attorney General (1857)

| colspan="6" style="text-align:center;background-color: #e9e9e9;"| General Election, November 3, 1857

U.S. House of Representatives (1874, 1876, 1878, 1880)

| colspan="6" style="text-align:center;background-color: #e9e9e9;"| General Election, November 3, 1874

| colspan="6" style="text-align:center;background-color: #e9e9e9;"| General Election, November 7, 1876

| colspan="6" style="text-align:center;background-color: #e9e9e9;"| General Election, November 5, 1878

| colspan="6" style="text-align:center;background-color: #e9e9e9;"| General Election, November 2, 1880

Sources

Gabriel Bouck Photo & Bio – Oshkosh Public Museum
Gabriel Bouck Obituary – New York Times
Gabriel Bouck Obituary – The Stevens Point Journal, Stevens Point, WI
Excerpt from "History of the Fox River Valley Lake Winnebago and the Green Bay Region"; Hon. William A. Titus, Editor
Oshkosh Daily Northwestern via the Wisconsin Historical Society

References

External links

 
 

1828 births
1904 deaths
Wisconsin Attorneys General
Democratic Party members of the Wisconsin State Assembly
Politicians from Oshkosh, Wisconsin
Wisconsin lawyers
Iron Brigade
Union College (New York) alumni
People from Fulton, Schoharie County, New York
Democratic Party members of the United States House of Representatives from Wisconsin
19th-century American politicians
Speakers of the Wisconsin State Assembly